A pleasure garden is a park or garden that is open to the public for recreation and entertainment. Pleasure gardens differ from other public gardens by serving as venues for entertainment, variously featuring such attractions as concert halls, bandstands, amusement rides, zoos, and menageries.

Historically a "pleasure garden" or pleasure ground meant private flower gardens, shrub gardens or formal wooded areas such as bosquets, that were planted for enjoyment, with ornamental plants and neat paths for walking. These were distinguished from the areas in a large garden planted as lawns or a landscaped park, or the "useful" areas of the kitchen garden and woodland. Thus most modern gardens would have been called "pleasure gardens", especially in the 17th and 18th centuries. 

The two meanings of the term, as the ornamental parts of a garden, and as a commercial place of entertainment, coexisted in English from at least the 17th century.

History
Public pleasure gardens have existed for many centuries. In Ancient Rome, the landscaped Gardens of Sallust (Horti Sallustiani) were developed as a private garden by the historian Sallust. The gardens were acquired by the Roman Emperor Tiberius for public use. Containing many pavilions, a temple to Venus, and monumental sculptures, the gardens were open to the public for centuries.

Public pleasure gardens were opened in London from the later 17th century; many had previously been parts of large private gardens, so the garden layout already existed. Usually entrance required payment. Marylebone Gardens was visited by Samuel Pepys on 7 May 1668: "And we abroad to Marrowbone, and there walked in the garden, the first time I ever was there, and a pretty place it is". Cuper's Gardens, on the southern bank of the River Thames, opened in the 1680s. These both expanded their areas greatly in the 18th century, the heyday of the pleasure garden.  

New openings in the 18th and 19th centuries in London included Cremorne Gardens, Ranelagh Gardens, Royal Surrey Gardens, Vauxhall Gardens and Royal Flora Gardens. Other cities, in England and abroad, acquired their own, such as Holte Bridgman's Apollo Gardens in Birmingham (1740s) and Leeds Royal Park in 1858.

Many contained large concert halls, or hosted promenade concerts; some lesser discussed pleasure gardens were home to haberdasheries and harems. A smaller version of a pleasure garden is a tea garden, where visitors may drink tea and stroll.

See also
 List of garden types

References

Further reading
Wroth, A. E. & W. W. The London Pleasure Gardens of the Eighteenth Century (MacMIllan, 1896).

External links
 

 
Parks
Types of garden